MV Cuthred was an Isle of Wight ro-ro ferry built in 1969. From 1990 until 2009, she operated as Mira Praia in Portugal.

History
MV Cuthred was built by Richards of Lowestoft for British Rail (later Sealink) at a cost of £275,000. She is named after Cuthred, king of Wessex (c.740–56). With a gross tonnage of 704, she was the largest Isle of Wight Ferry of the time, capable of carrying 48 cars and 400 passengers.

Layout
MV Cuthred was much larger and of a different design to any previous Isle of Wight car ferry. For the first time, passenger accommodation was located above the car deck and extended over the entire width of the vehicle deck.

At her annual refit in 1977/78, she was fitted with a hoist-able mezzanine deck, increasing her car capacity from 48 to 72, and larger outside decks were also fitted, to match her half sister Caedmon.

Service
MV Cuthred entered service on the Portsmouth to Fishbourne route in June 1969. She joined the 1961 vessels, Camber Queen and Fishbourne, bringing a much higher level of service to the route. She had a service speed of 10 knots, similar to her predecessors, but was considered to be underpowered.

Her two V8 Paxman 8RPHCM main engines each had to drive a generator in addition to the Voith Schneider propellers. 
Despite also having a third independent generator driven by a 6-cylinder Ruston 6YEZ diesel engine, at times of high electrical demand, the main generators drew around 95bhp from each engine, leaving insufficient power to the propellers, the service speed suffering as a result, particularly in bad weather.

Assessments were made into increasing her propulsive power during her years of service on the Portsmouth to Fishbourne route by removing the generators from the main engines and driving them independently, but this would have required larger Voith-Schneider propellers to have been installed.
The other option was to have an additional pair of Paxman engines and Voith-Schneider propellers fitted, but in the end the plans were rejected.

She ran on the route until 1986, when Sealink ownership passed to Sea Containers. She was laid up in 1987 at Lymington for nearly 2 years. 
During 1989 she was sold to Open Leisure for use on the Tyne. She was renamed Clemtyne, and the plan was to convert her into a Mississippi river style paddle boat, complete with a large stern wheel, but nothing materialised and she was resold in 1990 to Transado of Portugal. 
She operated, as Mira Praia, between Setúbal and Tróia, from 1990 until 2009, latterly carrying passengers only.

Her old Paxman engines were replaced with newer units around 1999/2000....these were the replacement engines that were fitted to her older running mate, the 1961-built Mira Troia (ex-Camber Queen, also ran together on the Portsmouth-Fishbourne service)
No details available of engine type, but they had more power than the originals.

She remains laid up to this day, slowly decaying, just a couple of miles from the route she served for almost 19 years.

Footnotes

Ferry transport on the Isle of Wight
Ferry transport in Portugal
1969 ships